Karakoram Express is a passenger train operated daily by Pakistan Railways between Karachi and Lahore. The train is named after the famous Karakoram mountain range of northern Pakistan.

History
Karakoram Express was inaugurated on 14 August 2002. This was during a period where Pakistan Railways went through several "facelifts" under Pervez Musharraf's government (including Karachi Express, Tezgam and Shalimar Express). Karakoram Express acquired the title of the "fastest train in Pakistan".

Route
 Karachi Cantonment–Khanewal Junction via Karachi–Peshawar Railway Line
 Khanewal Junction–Sangla Hill Junction via Khanewal–Wazirabad Branch Line
 Sangla Hill Junction–Shahdara Bagh Junction via Shahdara Bagh–Sangla Hill Branch Line
 Shahdara Bagh Junction–Lahore Junction via Karachi–Peshawar Railway Line

Station stops
Karachi Cantonment
Hyderabad Junction
Rohri Junction
Bahawalpur
Khanewal Junction
Faisalabad
Lahore Junction

Equipment
The train operates 13 economy carriages, 4 AC Business carriages, 1 power van and 1 luggage van.

References

Named passenger trains of Pakistan
Passenger trains in Pakistan